The 1923–24 Challenge Cup was the 24th staging of rugby league's oldest knockout competition, the Challenge Cup.

The final was contested by Wigan and Oldham at the Athletic Grounds in Rochdale.

The final was played on Saturday 12 April 1924, where Wigan beat Oldham 21–4 in front of a crowd of 41,831.

First round

Second round

Quarterfinals

Semifinals

Final

References

External links
Challenge Cup official website 
Challenge Cup 1923/24 results at Rugby League Project

Challenge Cup
Challenge Cup